The Palestinian governments of 2013 were two Palestinian governments established respectively in June and September 2013. They ruled de facto over the West Bank only.

The Palestinian government of June 2013 was led by Rami Hamdallah, appointed by Palestinian President Mahmoud Abbas by presidential decree on 6 June 2013 in Ramallah, the West Bank. The cabinet comprised 24 members, and was not presented for approval by the Palestinian Legislative Council. Two weeks later, Hamdallah resigned in protest at the appointment of two deputy prime ministers for political and economic affairs. Hamdallah later backtracked from his resignation and on 19 September 2013, the cabinet was sworn in for the second time, without any changes.

The Hamdallah government succeeded the successive governments of Salam Fayyad, who had resigned as a consequence of the 2011–2012 anti-corruption protests.

Timeline
On 14 February 2013, amid pan-Arab calls for reform, Prime Minister Fayyad submitted to President Abbas his resignation along with that of his cabinet. After consultations with other factions, institutions, and civil society groups, Abbas asked Fayyad to form a new government. The reshuffle had long been demanded by Fayyad as well as members of Abbas's Fatah faction.

On 6 June 2013, President Mahmud Abbas appointed Rami Hamdallah Prime Minister, but was not presented for approval by the Palestinian Legislative Council. 

Two weeks later, Hamdallah resigned in protest at the appointment of two deputy prime ministers for political and economic affairs.

On 23 June 2013, Abbas accepted Hamdallah’s resignation, but asked him to stay on on a caretaker basis until a new premier could be appointed. 

On 19 September 2013, Hamdallah withdrew his resignation and the government was sworn in for the second time, without any changes.

In June 2014, the government was replaced by a Fatah-Hamas unity government, with Hamdallah as prime minister.

Members of the Government 
June 2013 to June 2014

See also
Palestinian government
Hamas government of 2012

References

Cabinets established in 2013
2013 establishments in the State of Palestine
2014 disestablishments in the State of Palestine
State of Palestine governments
Cabinets disestablished in 2014